René Antonio Römer (2 July 1929, Willemstad, Curaçao – 25 February 2003, Curaçao) was Governor of the Netherlands Antilles from 1983 to 1990. He was also a professor of sociology at the University of the Netherlands Antilles and at the University of Groningen in the Netherlands.

References 

1929 births
2003 deaths
Dutch sociologists
Governors of the Netherlands Antilles
Curaçao politicians
Radboud University Nijmegen alumni
Leiden University alumni
Academic staff of the University of Groningen
Academic staff of the University of Curaçao
People from Willemstad